Harry Cleaver (1880 – ?) was an English footballer who played as a forward. Born in Macclesfield, he played for Desborough Town and Manchester United.

External links
MUFCInfo.com profile

1880 births
Year of death missing
English footballers
Desborough Town F.C. players
Manchester United F.C. players
Sportspeople from Macclesfield
Association football forwards